Keryado was a French fishing trawler that was built in 1904 Silvain for Dutch owners. She was sold to Iceland in 1916 and renamed Thorstein Ingolffson. In 1917 she was acquired by the French Navy for use as the watchboat Chimpanzé. She was sold in 1919 and became the French fishing boat Keryado, later Keryado II. In 1942, she was requistioned  by the Kriegsmarine, serving as the Vorpostenboot V 423 Keryado II. She was returned to her owners in 1945 and was scrapped in 1955.

Description
The engine was built by Wilton's Engineering & Slipway Co., Rotterdam, South Holland, Netherlands. It was rated at 49nhp. It drove a single screw propeller.

History
The ship was built as yard number 326 by M. van der Kuijl, Slikkerveer, South Holland, Netherlands, for the Stoomvisserij Maatschappij Mercurius, IJmuiden, North Holland. She was named Silvain. In 1916, she was sold to P. J. Thorsteinsson, Reykjavík, Iceland, and was renamed Thorstein Ingolffson. The Code Letters LOFJ were allocated. In 1917, she was acquired by the French Navy, serving until 1919 as the watchboat Chimpanzé.

In 1919, she was sold to the Société Anonyme Chautiers de l'Ouest, Saint-Nazaire, Ille-et-Vilaine, France, becoming the French fishing boat Keryado. The Code Letters OKTH were allocated. Based at Fécamp, Seine-Inférieure, the fishing boat registration F 751 was allocated,. By 1930, she was owned by R.Benoist. According to Lloyd's Register, she was renamed Keryado II in 1931 and had been sold to the Société Vasse et Compagnie, Fécamp. In 1934, her Code Letters were changed to FOHW.

Keryado II was requistioned by the Kriegsmarine in 1942 for use as a vorpostenboot. She was commissioned on 20 August 1942 as V 423 Keryado II. She was returned to her owners in 1945. Société Vasse et Compagnie was by now Philippe Vasse et Compagnie. The Code Letters FORW were allocated. Keryado II was scrapped in 1955.

Notes

References

Sources

1904 ships
Ships built in the Netherlands
Steamships of the Netherlands
Merchant ships of the Netherlands
World War I merchant ships of the Netherlands
Steamships of Denmark
World War I merchant ships of Denmark
Steamships of France
Auxiliary ships of the French Navy
Merchant ships of France
World War II merchant ships of France
Steamships of Germany
Auxiliary ships of the Kriegsmarine